Journal of the Physical Society of Japan (JPSJ) is a monthly,  peer reviewed, scientific journal published by the Physical Society of Japan (JPS). It was first published in July 1946 (volume 1). The editor-in-chief was A. Kawabata until August 2010. The impact factor for JPSJ in 2017 is 1.485, according to  Journal Citation Reports.

Volume 1 consists of a single issue designated, on the cover, from July to December 1946. And between 1967-1980 this journal published at a rate of two volumes per year. The other (Japanese) title for this journal is Nihon Butsuri Gakkai ōji hōkoku. Volumes for 1967 to the present day are accompanied by an annual supplement.

Research paper formats include full papers, letters, short notes, comments, addenda, errata, invited papers and special topics.

Organizational structure
The organizational structure of the journal is described as follows:

The Full Papers, Letters and Short Notes sections of the journal comprise the published original research results. Furthermore, the Full Papers section is intended to be self-contained, original research papers. The Short Notes are brief reporting on recent breakthroughs. Finally, invited reviews from a notable researcher in the field, and a collection of relevant subjects under Special Topics  are occasionally included for publication.

All articles are published online in advance, before they are printed on paper. The online version of JPSJ is updated twice a month (on the 10th and 25th). The paper version of JPSJ is printed once per month (on the 15th). This version comprises the two groups of articles that are published online on two different dates.

Overview
The journal was established in 1946, succeeding its predecessor publication, Proceedings of the Physico-Mathematical Society of Japan. In its present state, JPSJ is an international journal, with submissions from authors worldwide. Additionally, financial support is available to those authors in need from developing countries.

The online version has allowed for notable extra information to be available. Certain significant works are selected and emphasized on the journals' homepage. In the News and Comments column the background and impact of selected researchers are discussed by those who are described as experts, which indirectly provides the added dimension of relevant information about recent developments in physics.

Scope
The main focus of JPSJ is all topics related to physics. This includes pure and applied physics research topics which encompass core physics disciplines, and  broad topical coverage that is related to these core disciplines. Hence, subject areas cover an exploration and investigation of nature and substances that exist in the world and the universe, from atomic to cosmological scales. This encompasses defining and describing observations, interactions, and forces which occur in nature and, hence, in substances. Such descriptions may include their effect on, or within, a given natural system. More broadly, it is the general analysis of nature, conducted in order to understand how the universe behaves. Therefore, subject areas encompass energy, forces, mechanics, radiation, heat, matter, electromagnetism, quantum mechanics and general theory of relativity.

Previous and current IF
Thomson Reuters, Journal Citation Reports rated JPSJ with an impact factor of 2.212 in 2008, and an impact factor of 2.572 in 2009.

Abstracting and indexing
Journal of the Physical Society of Japan is indexed in the following bibliographic databases:  
Chemical Abstracts 0009-2258
Chemical Abstracts Service -CASSI
Current Contents - Physical, Chemical & Earth Sciences
Science Citation Index
Science Citation Index Expanded

See also
American Journal of Physics
Annales Henri Poincaré
Applied Physics Express
CRC Handbook of Chemistry and Physics
European Physical Journal E: Soft Matter and Biological Physics
Journal of Physics A: Mathematical and Theoretical
Journal of Physical and Chemical Reference Data
Physical Review E: Statistical, Nonlinear, and Soft Matter Physics
Physics Today

References

English-language journals
Physics journals
Publications established in 1946
Monthly journals